John Skoyles (born December 11, 1949 in Queens, New York) is an American poet and writer.

Early years
John Skoyles was born in Flushing, New York, the son of Olga (Bertolotti) and Gerard Skoyles, an envelope salesman. He attended Mater Christi High School, graduating in 1967. He did his undergraduate work at Fairfield University in Connecticut, and earned an M.A. in English and an M. F. A. at the University of Iowa.

Career
John Skoyles has taught at Southern Methodist University, Sarah Lawrence College, Warren Wilson College (where he directed the MFA program) and Emerson College.  He has also served as the Executive Director of the Fine Arts Work Center in Provincetown from 1992–94 and again in 2007.

He has written twelve books of fiction, nonfiction and poetry and is the poetry editor of Ploughshares.  His work has appeared in The New York Times, The New Yorker, The Atlantic, American Poetry Review, Poetry, The Paris Review and others . He is a member of the Order of the Occult Hand and of the Writing Committee of the Fine Arts Work Center in Provincetown, Massachusetts. His latest book of prose is Driven, a memoir in travelogue form.  His seventh book of poems, Yes and No, was published by Carnegie-Mellon University Press in the fall of 2021. He lives in New York City.

Bibliography

Poetry 
Collections

 Permanent Change (Carnegie Mellon University Press, 1991)
 Definition of the Soul (Carnegie Mellon University Press, 1998)
 The Situation, (Carnegie Mellon University Press, 2007)
 Suddenly It's Evening: Selected Poems (Carnegie Mellon University Press, 2016)
Inside Job: New Poems (Carnegie Mellon University Press, 2016)
Yes and No (Carnegie-Mellon University Press, 2021)
List of poems

Novels 
 A Moveable Famine (The Permanent Press, 2014)

Non-fiction 
 The Smoky Mountain Cage Bird Society and Other Magical Tales from Everyday Life (New York: "Kodansha International, 1997)
The Nut File (Quale Press, 2017) 
Driven (MadHat Press, 2019)
Memoirs
 Generous Strangers and Other Moments from My Life (New York: Kodansha International, 1999) This is a re-titled paperback reprint of "The Smoky Mountain Cage Bird Society."
 Secret Frequencies: A New York Education (Lincoln: University of Nebraska Press, 2003)

References

External links
 John Skoyles Official Website
Listen to "Three Shards" on Slate Magazine
NPR Interview
  Autobiography
  https://www.newyorker.com/magazine/2017/07/24/my-mother-heidegger-and-derrida
https://www.ronslate.com/on-yes-and-no-by-john-skoyles-alive-at-the-end-of-the-world-by-saeed-jones-true-figures-by-david-blair/

Sources
Contemporary Authors Online. The Gale Group, 2005.

1949 births
Living people
20th-century American poets
20th-century American male writers
American male poets
Emerson College faculty
Fairfield University alumni
People from Queens, New York
The New Yorker people